Cherie Chung Chor-hung (born 16 February 1960) is a retired Hong Kong film actress. Of Hakka ancestry, she was one of the top actresses in Hong Kong film during the 1980s.

Background
Chung participated in the 1979 Miss Hong Kong competition and came in 3rd runner-up. She was later discovered by film director Johnnie To and debuted in his first film The Enigmatic Case (1980).

Her beauty and charm led her to become one of the top actresses in Hong Kong at the time. In her film career, one of her most famous performances was in Mabel Cheung's An Autumn's Tale (1987), where she portrayed Jennifer, an educated middle-class woman who falls in love with a rude and uneducated man played by Chow Yun-fat. The film became one of the most successful romance flicks in Hong Kong film history. She is known as the "Marilyn Monroe" of Hong Kong and the Chinese entertainment industry due to her beautiful looks. Chung retired from acting in the 1990s. Her last film was John Woo's Once a Thief (1991), which was also a classic.

She married advertising guru Mike Chu in 1991 in the United States. Chu was known for his achievements in the Hong Kong advertising industry. Before the wedding, they come into agreement to be "child-free". On 24 August 2007, Chu died of stomach cancer. He was given a Catholic funeral.

She is also very active in promoting environmental protection.

Filmography

Film 
Once a Thief (1991) – Red Bean
Zodiac Killers (1991) – Mang Tit Lan
Stars & Roses (1989)
Happy Together (1989)
Wild Search (1989) – Cher
Diary of a Small Man (1989)
Last Romance (1988)
Golden Years (1988) – Chu So-So
Mr. Mistress (1988) –  Ho's girlfriend
Chaos by Design (1988)
The Good, the Bad and the Beauty (1988) – Ko Sau-Ping
The Eight Happiness (1988) – Beautiful
Golden Swallow (1988) – Hsiao-Hsueh/Lu Hsiao-Ping
18 Times (1988)
Carry on Hotel (1988)
Bet on Fire (1988) – Hung
Walk on Fire (1988) – Miss Chung
Couples, Couples, Couples (1988) – Mary Huang
Fatal Love (1988) – Cecilia Yau Tai-Kam
The Yuppie Fantasia (1988)
One Husband Too Many (1988) – Frances
Moon, Stars & Sun (1988) – GiGi
An Autumn's Tale (1987) – Jennifer
Spooky Kama Sutra (1987)
Spiritual Love (1987) – Wei Hsiao-Tieh
Goodbye Darling (1987) – Josephine
Double Fixation (1987)
Peking Opera Blues (1986) – Sheung Hung
Happy Ding Dong (1986) – Din-Din
Fascinating Affairs (1985) – Diana
Women (1985)
The Flying Mr. B (1985)
Cher, Last Victory (1984) – Cherie Teng
Banana Cop (1984) – Amy
The Hidden Power of the Dragon Sabre (1984)
My Darling Genie (1984)
Prince Charming (1984) – Yuk Duk-mei
Maybe It's Love (1984)
Heaven Can Help (1984) – Cathy
Descendant of the Sun (1983) – Princess
Hong Kong, Hong Kong (1983) – Man Si Sun 
Hong Kong Playboys (1983) – Mei
Boys and Girls (1983)
Winners and Sinners (1983) – Shirley
Twinkle Twinkle Little Star (1983)
Eclipse (1982)
The Dead and the Deadly (1982) – Miss Yuen
It Takes Two (1982)
The Story of Woo Viet (1981) – Shum Ching
The Postman Strikes Back (1981) – Guihua
The Enigmatic Case (1980) – Yao Puipui

Television 
 Floating Clouds (1981) (RTHK television series "Hong Kong, Hong Kong", no. 1)

References

External links 
 
 Cherie Chung Cho Hung at hkmdb.com
 Cherie Chung Chor Hung at hkcinemagic.com
 Movie stills from An Autumn's Tale (Japan version) 
 Floating Clouds (45 minutes; RTHK television series "Hong Kong, Hong Kong", no. 1; broadcast on 17 October 1981; RTHK official website)
 Ford, Stacilee. Mabel Cheung Yuen-Ting's An Autumn's Tale (Hong Kong: Hong Kong University Press, 2008)

1960 births
Living people
Hong Kong film actresses
Hong Kong environmentalists
Hong Kong women environmentalists
Hong Kong people of Hakka descent
People from Boluo
Indigenous inhabitants of the New Territories in Hong Kong
Hong Kong Roman Catholics